Charles Niroshan may refer to

Niroshan Bandaratilleke, Sri Lankan cricketer
Niroshan Dickwella, Sri Lankan cricketer
Niroshan Mani, Indian footballer
Niroshan Illeperuma, actor
Niroshan Perera, Sri Lankan politician
Niroshan Premaratne, Sri Lankan politician
Niroshan Wijekoon, Sri Lanka badminton player
Chaminda Niroshan, Sri Lankan cricketer

Sinhalese masculine given names